WTMZ (910 AM, "The Zone") is a radio station broadcasting a sports format. Licensed to Dorchester Terrace–Brentwood, South Carolina, United States, it serves the Charleston area.  The station is currently owned by Kirkman Broadcasting, Inc..

On August 17, 2020, WTMZ ended its simulcast of WTMZ-FM "ESPN Charleston" and began airing programming previously heard on WQSC.

References

External links

TMZ
Radio stations established in 1993
CBS Sports Radio stations
1993 establishments in South Carolina
Sports radio stations in the United States